Lucas Pouille was the defending champion, but lost in the semifinals to Milos Raonic.

Roger Federer won his first title in Stuttgart, defeating Raonic in the final, 6–4, 7–6(7–3). By reaching the final, Federer regained the ATP no. 1 singles ranking. This was his record extending 18th Grass Court Title.

Seeds
The top four seeds receive a bye into the second round.

Draw

Finals

Top half

Bottom half

Qualifying

Seeds

Qualifiers

Lucky loser

Qualifying draw

First qualifier

Second qualifier

Third qualifier

Fourth qualifier

External links
 Main draw
 Qualifying draw

2018 ATP World Tour
2018 Singles